The Meziad is a river in Bihor County, western Romania. It is a left tributary of the river Valea Roșie. It flows into the Valea Roșie in Remetea.

References

Rivers of Romania
Rivers of Bihor County